Watford Football Club is an English football club from Watford, Hertfordshire. They played the 2014–15 season in the Football League Championship, for the eighth consecutive season since relegation from the Premier League in 2006–07, securing promotion following a 2–0 win against Brighton & Hove Albion on 25 April 2015, after spending eight consecutive seasons in the Championship. The team's manager was Slaviša Jokanović.

Competitions

Pre-season matches

Championship

League table

League results summary

Matches 
The fixtures for the 2014–15 season were announced on 18 June 2014 at 9am.

FA Cup

League Cup

The draw for the first round was made on 17 June 2014 at 10am. Watford were drawn away to Stevenage.

Squad statistics

No. = Squad number

Pos = Playing position

P = Number of games played

G = Number of goals scored

 = Yellow cards

GK = Goalkeeper

DF = Defender

MF = Midfielder

FW = Forward

 = Red cards

Yth = Whether player went through Watford's youth system

Joined club = Year that player became a Watford first team player

Age = Current age

 Loan player

Statistics correct as of 2 May 2015.

Staff

Non-playing staff

Information correct as of 13 May 2015.

Former non-playing staff
 Head coach: Beppe Sannino (until 31 August)
 Head coach: Óscar García (2–29 September)
 Head-coach: Billy McKinlay (29 September–7 October; assistant coach: 26–29 September)
 Assistant coach: Giovanni Cusatis (until 11 September)
 Assistant coach: Francesco Troise (until 11 September)
 Technical director: Gianluca Nani (until 2 September)
 Youth team coach: David Hughes (until 6 August)
 Head of medical: Marco Cesarini (until late December)
 First-team analyst: Adam Carter

Transfers

In

Out

Loans in

Loans outs

Reserves and academy
In 2014–15, Watford's under-21 side competed in the Under-21 Premier League Cup, progressing through four rounds before losing 3–2 away at Southampton in the quarter-finals. They also played in the Herts Senior Cup, progressing through one round before losing to Hemel Hempstead in the quarter-finals. The under-18s finished 5th in the South-East Conference of the Football League Youth Alliance, subsequently qualifying for Merit League One. In the FA Youth Cup they entered in the third round, losing 3–1 away at Swansea.

Watford's academy in 2014–15 consisted of 17 scholars:
 In the second year: Arie Ammann, Matthew Hall, Harry Kyprianou, Dennon Lewis, Mahlondo Martin, Il Myeong Choi, Kunle Otudeko, Carl Stewart and Alfie Young.
 In the first year: Jacob Cook, Andrew Eleftheriou, Michael Folivi, Max Makaka, Brandon Mason, Ogo Obi, Charlie Rowan and Connor Stevens.

Panos Armenakas was announced as joining the first-year in April 2014, but in June he signed for Italian club Udinese, who are also owned by the Pozzo family. On 1 September the club announced second-year midfielder Tom Rosenthal had left to join Belgian side S.V. Zulte Waregem in order for him to be closer to an ill family member. On 15 September striker Ogo Obi signed a two-year scholarship deal with the club, with a one-year professional deal from its expiration in 2016. Obi had been with the club since the under-11 age-group, but had spent time on trial with Manchester United over the pre-season. Goalkeeper Shaun Rowley, a scholar with Shrewsbury Town, joined the academy on a youth loan for the early part of the reason, returning to his parent club in October. Stewart transferred to Udinese in January. In February Folivi signed a deal that would see him become professional at the end of his scholarship in 2016, with the club holding the option of adding a further year.

On 1 May, Watford announced that Lewis, Martin and Young would be offered professional contracts of an unspecified length, while Hall would have his scholarship extended after he suffered from an injury in 2014–15. Ammann, Choi, Otudeko and Kyprianou, who was an unused substitute for the first-team's FA Cup game away at Bristol City on 4 January 2014, were released.

References

Watford F.C. seasons
Watford F.C.